Edward Wallace Scudder (August 12, 1822 – February 3, 1893) was a justice of the New Jersey Supreme Court from 1869 until his death.

He graduated Princeton University in 1841 and then studied law with the Hon. William L. Dayton. He was admitted as an attorney in 1844, and called to the bar in 1848; Scudder was elected to the New Jersey Senate, and served his term there of three years, ending in 1865, the last year serving as president.

He was appointed judge by Governor of New Jersey Theodore Fitz Randolph in 1869, by Governor Joseph D. Bedle in 1876, reappointed by Governor George C. Ludlow in 1883, and by Governor Leon Abbett in 1890.

He died February 3, 1893, and is buried at Riverview Cemetery in Trenton.

See also
List of justices of the Supreme Court of New Jersey
New Jersey Court of Errors and Appeals
Courts of New Jersey
Newark Evening News
Richard Scudder

References

1822 births
1893 deaths
Justices of the Supreme Court of New Jersey
Presidents of the New Jersey Senate
Princeton University alumni
19th-century American politicians
19th-century American judges